Mylothris atewa, the Atewa dotted border, is a butterfly in the  family Pieridae. It is endemic to the Atewa Range near Kibi, between Accra and Kumasi in Ghana. The habitat consists of upland evergreen forest.

References

Butterflies described in 1980
Pierini
Endemic fauna of Ghana
Butterflies of Africa